The 2017 CAF Champions League (officially the 2017 Total CAF Champions League for sponsorship reasons) was the 53rd edition of Africa's premier club football tournament organized by the Confederation of African Football (CAF), and the 21st edition under the current CAF Champions League title.

Starting from this season, the group stage was expanded from eight to 16 teams, divided into four groups of four, and the knockout stage expanded from 4 to 8 teams.

Wydad AC defeated Al Ahly in the final to win their second African Cup of Champions Clubs/CAF Champions League title, and qualified as the CAF representative at the 2017 FIFA Club World Cup in the United Arab Emirates, and also earned the right to play against the winners of the 2017 CAF Confederation Cup, TP Mazembe, in the 2018 CAF Super Cup. Mamelodi Sundowns were the defending champions, but were eliminated in the quarter-finals by Wydad Casablanca.

Association team allocation
All 56 CAF member associations may enter the CAF Champions League, with the 12 highest ranked associations according to their CAF 5-Year Ranking eligible to enter two teams in the competition. As a result, theoretically a maximum of 68 teams could enter the tournament – although this level has never been reached.

For the 2017 CAF Champions League, the CAF uses the 2011–2015 CAF 5-Year Ranking, which calculates points for each entrant association based on their clubs’ performance over those 5 years in the CAF Champions League and CAF Confederation Cup. The criteria for points are the following:

The points are multiplied by a coefficient according to the year as follows:
2015 – 5
2014 – 4
2013 – 3
2012 – 2
2011 – 1

Teams
The following 55 teams from 43 associations entered the competition.
Teams in bold received a bye to the first round.
The other teams entered the preliminary round.

Associations are shown according to their 2011–2015 CAF 5-Year Ranking – those with a ranking score have their rank and score indicated.

Notes

Associations which did not enter a team

 Benin
 Cape Verde
 Central African Republic
 Chad
 Djibouti
 Eritrea
 Guinea-Bissau
 Malawi
 Mauritania
 Namibia
 São Tomé and Príncipe
 Somalia
 Togo

Schedule
The schedule of the competition was as follows (matches scheduled in midweek in italics).

The calendar was amended from the original one for the following dates:
Quarter-finals first leg: moved from 8–10 September to 15–17 September
Quarter-finals second leg: moved from 15–17 September to 22–24 September
Semi-finals second leg: moved from 13–15 October to 20–22 October

Qualifying rounds

Preliminary round

First round

Group stage

Group A

Group B

Group C

Group D

Knockout stage

Bracket

Quarter-finals

Semi-finals

Final

Top goalscorers

Prize money
In 2017, the fixed amount of prize money paid to the clubs is as follows:

See also
2017 CAF Confederation Cup
2017 FIFA Club World Cup
2018 CAF Super Cup

References

External links
Total Champions League 2017, CAFonline.com

 
2017
1